Lechriolepis stumpffii is a species of moth of the  family Lasiocampidae.

Distribution
It is found in Madagascar.

References

External links

Lasiocampidae
Moths described in 1878